Euryphura achlys, the forest green butterfly or mottled-green nymph, is a butterfly of the family Nymphalidae. The southernmost limit is Ongoye Forest, South Africa. It is also found in the forests of eastern Zimbabwe, around Mulanje Massif in south eastern Malawi, Mozambique and Kenya.

The wingspan is 48–55 mm for males and 55–65 mm for females. Adults are on wing year round, but mainly from March to June.

Larval food plants are the common coca tree (Erythroxylum emarginatum) and Craibia brevicaudata.

References

 McGinley, M. (Ed) (2008). Eastern Zimbabwe montane forest-grassland mosaic. http://www.eoearth.org/article/Eastern_Zimbabwe_montane_forest-grassland_mosaic
 SABCA, the Animal Demography Unit (Department of Zoology, University of Cape Town), the South African National Biodiversity Institute and The Lepidopterists' Society of Africa. (2010)

External links
 Search for Distribution of Euryphura achlys in South Africa.
 Photos and information.

Limenitidinae
Butterflies described in 1855
Taxa named by Carl Heinrich Hopffer